Lake Highlands High School (LHHS) is a secondary school serving grades 9-12 in the Lake Highlands area of northeastern Dallas, Texas, United States, primarily serving the Lake Highlands community. The school is part of the Richardson Independent School District and is in central Lake Highlands near the DART Blue Line. The Lake Highlands Freshman Center (which sits on the same property as LHHS) formerly housed the 9th-grade students, but has recently been integrated into the rest of the school, housing classes for all 9-12 students. The first graduating class of Lake Highlands High School was in 1964.

History
On May 16, 1983, Lake Highlands High School was the site of a fatal armed robbery when Billy Conn Gardner (1943-1995) entered the school's office, shot and fatally wounded 64-year-old cafeteria supervisor Thelma Row, and stole $1,600 in cash. Gardner was sentenced to death for the crime and was executed by lethal injection in 1995.

On May 30, 2021, valedictorian Paxton Smith replaced her approved speech to the graduating class to attack the limitations on abortion in Texas Senate Bill 8 of the 87th legislature, a heartbeat bill signed by the governor earlier that month.

Academics
In 2002, the school received a Blue Ribbon award from the U.S. Department of Education.

Extracurricular activities

Athletics

The school mascot is the Wildcat. This is also the mascot of several of the high school's feeder schools including Lake Highlands Elementary, Northlake Elementary, and [Lake Highlands Junior High School]].

The school's football team has been in the UIL regional and state playoffs numerous times, and won the class 5A state championship in 1981. The school has won district championships in baseball over 20 times since 1964.

The school has also won several district titles in boys Basketball including winning the 1968 and 2023 State Championships in Class 3A and 6A, respectively.

As the second high school in the Richardson Independent School District, the Wildcats maintained a long standing rivalry with the Richardson High School Eagles. The two teams shared the old Greenville Avenue Stadium, which was located by the now RISD Administration Building, before both schools opened stadiums on their respective campuses. With the opening of L.V. Berkner High School and the eventual sharing of Wildcat-Ram Stadium, that rivalry naturally occurred. Recently, a rivalry with the J.J. Pearce High School Mustangs has grown.

Opened in 1969 as "Lake Highlands Stadium", RISD's Wildcat-Ram Stadium is located on the western border of the campus.   The stadium is shared with L.V. Berkner High School as the Berkner campus is home to a natatorium but not a full size stadium.  The facility seats approximately 9,000 and was upgraded to field turf in 2000. The 2006 bond issue included funds to renovate the original pressbox and a new videoboard in the north endzone replaced the original scoreboard in the south endzone. Prior to the installation of the artificial playing surface, Wildcat-Ram had served as the showcase facility for the Dallas Cup youth soccer tournament due to the fact that it was the only facility of its size with natural grass inside Interstate 635.  It was re-named for the mascots of both schools after the opening of Berkner's permanent campus in 1970-71.teams. Lake Highlands and Berkner have long been rivals in football and other sports.. Wildcat-Ram Stadium earned the nickname "The Boneyard" from LHHS students and fans and local sports media in reference to the team's use of the wishbone formation rushing attach and suffocating defense under then head coach Mike Zoffuto. It also utilized as the home field for both of Lake Highlands High School's feeder junior highs, Lake Highlands Junior High School and Forest Meadow Junior High School, which end their football regular seasons with the annual "Battle for the Boneyard" trophy.  

The Multi-Purpose Activity Center ("MAC") was completed in 2021 as part of the renovation of the entire campus. The 78,000 square foot facility includes an 80 yard indoor practice field and 24,000 square feet for offices, locker rooms, weight room and sport support areas.

Band
The school is the home of the "Wildcat Band", which consists of the Wildcat Marching Band, Jazz Band, several Concert Bands (including Concert, Symphonic, and Wind Ensemble), Winterguard, Percussion Program, Symphony Orchestra, and puts on a yearly Musical. The Symphonic Band made its first trip to the Midwest Band and Orchestra Clinic in December 1971.  Later that school year, the band was selected as the Texas Music Educators Association (TMEA) Honor Band and performed at the TMEA convention in February 1973. In 2021, the Marching Band was ranked as the top marching band in Richardson ISD, for the first time in the school’s history, after being named Grand Champion at the Midlothian Marching Showcase.

Dance team
The school is home of the "Wildcat Wranglers", one of the few high school Country/Western dance teams existing in the United States.

The school is also the home of the "Highlandettes", a Texas-style dance squad. They have performed in the Macy's Thanksgiving Day Parade numerous times, as well as at many Dallas Cowboys, Dallas Stars, and Dallas Mavericks games. They have also danced in Dublin, Ireland for the St. Patrick's Day parade; in Pearl Harbor, Honolulu, Hawaii, London, England; and Italy.

Notable alumni

 Amy Acker - actress
 Erin Aldrich - track and field athlete, high jumper in 2000 Summer Olympics
 Nicole Bilderback - actress
 Paul Broome - Major League Soccer player
 Josh Carter - basketball guard ; Texas A&M University, Maccabi Ashdod B.C.
 Warren Carter - University of Illinois basketball forward
 Marcus Coleman - former NFL safety for New York Jets, Houston Texans, and Dallas Cowboys 
 John A. Davis - film director, writer, animator, voice actor and composer
 Phil Dawson - NFL kicker; Arizona Cardinals, Cleveland Browns
 Matt Dunigan - CFL Hall of Famer
 Morgan Fairchild - Emmy and Golden Globe Award-nominated actress
 George Gimarc - local radio personality
 Merton Hanks - former NFL safety for San Francisco 49ers and Seattle Seahawks
 Chris Harrison - host of TV show The Bachelor
 Gibby Haynes - musician, lead singer for rock band Butthole Surfers
 C.B. Hudson - lead guitarist of rock band Blue October
 Justin Leonard - professional golfer, 1997 British Open champion
 Scott Livingstone - former MLB player
 Lusine - Electronic musician
 Sandra Lynch - United States Circuit Judge of the United States Court of Appeals for the First Circuit; first woman to serve on that Court; on June 16, 2008, became its first female chief judge.
 Scoot McNairy - actor
 Anastasia Muñoz - voice actress affiliated with Funimation
 Marshall Newhouse - NFL lineman, Green Bay Packers
 Reggie Newhouse - NFL wide receiver, Arizona Cardinals
 Frank Okam - football defensive tackle for University of Texas and Houston Texans
 Darvis Patton - Olympic track athlete
 Kent Perkins - NFL offensive tackle for Cincinnati Bengals
 Rich Phillips - radio personality, SportsRadio 1310 The Ticket 
 Alvin Rettig - Arena football running back/ linebacker for the Detroit Drive, member of Arena Football Hall of Fame
 James F. Reilly - NASA space shuttle astronaut, geologist
 St. Vincent - indie rock musician, real name Annie Clark
 Mark Salling - actor and singer on television show Glee
 Thomas Sleeper - classical composer
 Detron Smith - NFL running back (1996–2003) with Denver Broncos and Indianapolis Colts
 Granger Smith - country singer
 Wade Smith - Memphis University and NFL offensive tackle
 Matt Stover - NFL kicker with New York Giants, Cleveland Browns, Baltimore Ravens, and Indianapolis Colts
 Jordan Tata - former MLB player
 Nick Thurman - NFL defensive end with New England Patriots
 Andre Tillman - Miami Dolphins tight end (1975–1978)
 Kim Wozencraft - author

References

External links
 
 Richardson Independent School District

Richardson Independent School District high schools
Public high schools in Dallas